Mike McShane is a college men's ice hockey coach. He ranks ninth all-time among NCAA men's ice hockey coaches with 653 wins in 30 years as a head coach.  As the head coach at Norwich University since 1996, he has led his teams to the Frozen Four nine times and NCAA Division III national championships in 2000, 2003, 2010 and 2017.

Athlete
McShane grew up in Wakefield, Massachusetts and attended Wakefield High School and Tabor Academy.  He attended the University of New Hampshire where he was the assistant captain of the UNH hockey team.  He was  also named to the New England all-star team, and became the third-leading scorer in New Hampshire Wildcats' history.

Coaching career

Exeter and New Hampton
After graduating from UNH in 1971, McShane coached at Exeter Academy for one year and for six years at New Hampton School in New Hampton, New Hampshire.  In six years at New Hampton, McShane compiled a 122-26-2 record and led the school to three Division I Prep Championships.

Dartmouth College
McShane was hired as an assistant hockey coach at Dartmouth College in 1978 and was part of the coaching staff on Dartmouth teams that played in the Frozen Four in 1978 and 1980.

St. Lawrence University
McShane was hired by St. Lawrence University as its head hockey coach in 1980.  In five years as head coach, he led the St. Lawrence Saints ice hockey teams to one NCAA tournament berth and four straight appearances in the Eastern College Athletic Conference Division One tournament.

Providence College
In July 1985, McShane signed a multiyear contract to serve as the head ice hockey coach at Providence College. At the time of his hiring, Providence College athletic director Lou Lamoriello called McShane "probably one of the strongest people I've met in the coaching ranks ... a tireless worker and, most important, he's the type of person we want to represent us at Providence College."  McShane spent nine years as the hockey coach at Providence, including four consecutive seasons with at least 21 wins between 1989 and 1992.  He was named the New England Coach of the Year in 1989.

Norwich University
During the 1994-1995 season, McShane worked as a consultant for the Ottawa Senators, and took time off to complete a master's degree program at Boston University.  In the fall of 1995, McShane became the head hockey coach, golf coach and rink manager at Norwich University in Northfield, Vermont.  In December 1995, McShane told the Boston Herald, "People asked me why I'd want to go up here. Hey, I worked in the woods before.  It's a great spot. They're great kids. It's a unique atmosphere."  After a 12-12 record in his first season at Norwich, McShane has strung together 21 consecutive winning seasons from 1997 to 2017.  His Norwich teams advanced to the Frozen Four eight times and won NCAA Division III national championships in 2000, 2003, 2010, and 2017.

McShane led Norwich to its third national championship in March 2010 with a 2-1 in double-overtime win over St. Norbert College in the longest game (99 minutes, 29 seconds) in Division III championship history.  After the game, McShane said, "The kids played great. It was wild, crazy.  It was a beautiful goal. Serino made a great play to keep the puck in and put it down low to Thomas. He threw it out front. (Cotnoir) got a whack at it and then got the rebound. Bam! What an atmosphere. Some years you get lucky."

In 2014, McShane's longtime assistant coach Steve Mattson was honored as the recipient of the prestigious Terry Flanagan Award. The Flanagan Award presented by the American Hockey Coaches Association (AHCA) and is named in honor of the former New Hampshire player and Bowling Green assistant coach and has been given annually since 1997 to honor an assistant coaches' career body of work. Mattson is just the second Division III coach to win the award in the 18-year history.

McShane announced his retirement from Norwich as Head Coach on June 15, 2018.

Career records and honors
In 36 years as a head coach, McShane compiled a record of 721 wins, 343 losses, and 66 ties.  He has received the Edward Jeremiah Award five times (1997, 1999, 2000, 2010, and 2017).  The award is presented each year by the American Hockey Coaches Association to the Division III men's ice hockey Coach of the Year.  McShane and Bill Beaney are the only coaches to have received the award four times.  At the end of the 2009-2010 hockey season, McShane ranked ninth all-time among college men's ice hockey coaches.

McShane has coached a number of players who went on to professional hockey careers, including Tom Fitzgerald, Rob Gaudreau, Craig Darby, Chris Therien, Joe Hulbig, Hal Gill, Chris Terreri, Keith Aucoin, Randy Sexton, Marc Bellemare, and Kurtis McLean.

Head coaching record

College

† Providence finished the season in 3rd place but was surpassed by Boston University after Maine was retroactively forced to forfeit 13 games.

Family
McShane is married to Shawn McShane and resides in Montpelier, Vermont.  He has two adult children, Daniel and Megan.

See also
List of college men's ice hockey coaches with 400 wins

References

1947 births
Dartmouth Big Green men's ice hockey coaches
Living people
New Hampshire Wildcats men's ice hockey players
Norwich Cadets men's ice hockey coaches
Ottawa Senators coaches
People from Wakefield, Massachusetts
Providence Friars men's ice hockey coaches
Sportspeople from Middlesex County, Massachusetts
St. Lawrence Saints men's ice hockey coaches
Tabor Academy (Massachusetts) alumni